The 1960–61 Maltese First Division was the 46th season of top-tier football in Malta.  It was contested by 8 teams, and Hibernians F.C. won the championship.

League standings

Results

References
Malta - List of final tables (RSSSF)

Maltese Premier League seasons
Malta
Premier